The Mallorca Classic was a men's professional golf tournament on the European Tour, held between 2003 and 2007 at Pula Golf in Mallorca. It marked the return of the tour to the island, having previously played host to the Open de Baleares between 1988 and 1995.

In 2003 it was a dual-ranking event which also featured on the Challenge Tour calendar, before becoming a full European Tour event in 2004. From 2005 to 2007 it was the last tournament on the regular schedule before the "tour championship", the Volvo Masters, and as such was the last chance for players to make the top 115 on the Order of Merit to retain their tour card for the following season. In its final year the prize fund was €2 million. Its place on the European Tour schedule was taken by the Castelló Masters Costa Azahar for 2008.

Winners

Notes

External links
Coverage on the European Tour's official site

Former European Tour events
Former Challenge Tour events
Golf tournaments in Spain
Defunct sports competitions in Spain